Anna Kerth (born 1 November 1980) is a Polish actress who starred in BBC Scotland's soap opera River City as Lena Krausky in 2006/2007. In Poland she is mostly known for being part of the main cast in the popular soap opera Na Wspólnej.

Kerth was nominated to British Academy Scotland New Talent Awards for her role in Running in Traffic.

Filmography

 2004: Katatonia, as Marta
 2006–present: Na Wspólnej, as Małgosia Zimińska
 2006–2007: River City, as Lena Krausky
 2008: Last Supper, as Mother
 2009 - Running in Traffic, as Kayla Golebiowski
 2010: Happy Birthday Mom, as Katerina
 2012: Jak głęboki jest ocean, as Monica
 2013: Na dystans, as Matka
 2013: Ojcze masz, as Pani Doktor
 2014: Nie da się zabić tego miasta, as Janina Momontowicz

References

External links

Living people
1980 births
Polish film actresses
Actresses from Gdańsk
Polish soap opera actresses
Polish television actresses
American Conservatory Theater alumni
Alumni of the Academy of Music in Kraków
Polish stage actresses
Polish radio personalities
21st-century Polish actresses